Socket AMx may refer to:

 Socket AM2
 Socket AM2+
 Socket AM3
 Socket AM3+
 Socket AM1
 Socket AM4